Ngatikese Creole, also called Ngatik Men's Creole, is a creole language spoken mostly on the atoll of Sapwuahfik (formerly Ngatik) in the Caroline Islands. It is spoken by about 500 on the atoll, and by another 200 on the nearby major island of Pohnpei. It is a creole consisting of English and Sapwuahfik Pohnpeian spoken primarily by men, especially when engaged in communal activities such as fishing or boat-building, but is readily understood by women and children. It is used as a secret language by Ngatikese people when they are in the presence of Pohnpeian speakers. 

"Ngatikese" also refers to the non-creolized language, descending from Pohnpeian, that is spoken on the atoll.

History

The Ngatik Men's Creole developed as a result of the 1837 Ngatik massacre, during which the island's male population was wiped out by the crew of Australian captain C.H. Hart's ship Lambton and Pohnpeian warriors. Some of the Europeans and Pohnpeians settled and repopulated the island, taking the local women as wives. The island formed a new culture and language, a mixture of English and Ngatikese.

See also

Pidgin
Sapwuahfik
Pohnpeian language
Creole language
English-based creole languages
Ngatikese language
 Bonin English

References

External links 
 Kaipuleohone holds audio recordings of Ngatik Men's Creole including word lists, and a conversation

English-based pidgins and creoles
Languages of the Federated States of Micronesia
Pohnpeic languages
Pohnpei
Definitely endangered languages